Jim Pons (born March 14, 1943) is an American bassist, author, singer, and video director who most notably played for the Leaves (1964-1967, 1970-1971), the Turtles (1967-1970), and the Mothers of Invention (February–December 1971).

After leaving the music scene in 1973, he worked as a video director for the  New York Jets, and briefly the Jacksonville Jaguars. Jim designed the team logo for the New York Jets, which lasted from 1978 to 1997.

Biography

The Leaves 
Jim Pons was born in Santa Monica, California.

In 1964, he formed the garage rock band The Leaves. The band was founded by Pons and guitarist Robert Lee Reiner, who were Fraternity students at Cal State Northridge (then known as San Fernando Valley State College).

They were originally called The Rockwells, prior to changing their names to The Leaves. They got the name Leaves when one of the members greet another by saying “What’s happening?”, and the other responding with “The Leaves are happening”.

The Leaves eventually secured a regular gig replacing the Byrds as the house band at the popular nightclub Ciro's on the Sunset Strip. They signed with Mira Records after being heard by Pat Boone, who got them the position.

The Leaves are infamous for recording the first version of the song Hey Joe, which they recorded along with their debut album in 1966. Their version of Hey Joe went was a number one radio hit on the Los Angeles stations and peaked at #31 on the Billboard pop charts in May 1966.

Hey Joe would become popular in 1967 when it was covered by Jimi Hendrix. Pons stayed in the group until 1967. A reformed version was active between 1970–71.

The Turtles 
Pons joined The Turtles shortly after the Leaves. He played bass on their hit song Elenore. As a member of the Turtles, he appeared with them on television on both of their appearances on The Ed Sullivan Show, The Smothers Brothers Comedy Hour, and American Bandstand, among many others. Jim continued to tour with the Turtles until they split in 1970. He played on their last two album, The Turtles Present the Battle of the Bands (1968) and Turtle Soup (1969).

Since the 2010s, he has occasionally guest-starred with The Turtles alongside Flo and Eddie. Pons will usually join them on stage if they are performing in Florida, where he lives.

The Mothers Of Invention 
Pons was a member of Frank Zappa’s Mothers of Invention for a short period of time, between February to December 1971. He played bass on their live album Fillmore East – June 1971.

Pons portrayed himself in the 1971 surrealist film 200 Motels, starring the members of the Mothers Of Invention (although he was not credited).

Video Directing

New York Jets 
In 1973 Pons left the music industry to become the film and video director for the New York Jets football team; he designed the team's 1978–97 team logo. He held this position until around the year 2000.

Jacksonville Jaguars 
Pons and his family moved to Jacksonville, Florida in 2005, where he did game day video for the Jacksonville Jaguars, until he retired.

Personal life 
Pons plays upright bass in a bluegrass band called Lonesome Ride. Pons is a born again Christian and lives in Jacksonville, Florida.

Book 
In 2017, Pons wrote an autobiography titled Hard Core Love: Sex, Football and Rock and Roll in the Kingdom of God which won the 2017 Florida Writers Association Book Of The Year award. The book describes his life from forming the Leaves, joining the Turtles, to filming for the New York Jets and the Jacksonville Jaguars.

Bibliography 
 Hard Core Love: Sex, Football and Rock and Roll in the Kingdom of God (2017)

Filmography 

 200 Motels (1971) — himself (uncredited)

Discography

The Leaves 

 Hey Joe (1966)
 All The Good That's Happening (1967)
 The Leaves 1966 (1982)

The Turtles 

 The Turtles Present the Battle of the Bands (1968)
 Turtle Soup (1969)

The Mothers Of Invention 

 Fillmore East – June 1971 (1971)
 200 Motels (1971)

References

External links 

 
 

1943 births
Living people
American rock bass guitarists
American male bass guitarists
California State University, Northridge alumni
The Mothers of Invention members
Musicians from Santa Monica, California
The Turtles members
Guitarists from California
American male guitarists
20th-century American guitarists